Fujianese (or Fukienese) may refer to:
 someone or something related to Fujian, China
 all of the Min Chinese dialects of Fujian

Language and nationality disambiguation pages